Jeri Taylor (born June 30, 1938) is a television scriptwriter and producer, who wrote many episodes of the Star Trek: The Next Generation and Star Trek: Voyager series.

Early life
She is an alumna of Indiana University, where she was a member of Kappa Alpha Theta. She also received her M.A. in English from California State University, Northridge, in 1966.

Star Trek screenwriting
Taylor wrote scripts for television series like Little House on the Prairie and The Incredible Hulk, then served as a producer and director on Quincy, M.E. and Jake and the Fatman. While working on Jake and the Fatman, Taylor and her producer partner David Moessinger hired J. Michael Straczynski (who would later go on to create Babylon 5) as an executive story consultant, giving him his first experience working on an hour-long show. Taylor was recommended to the producers of Star Trek: The Next Generation by Lee Sheldon, with whom she had worked on Quincy.

Taylor joined The Next Generation staff at the beginning of the fourth season as a supervising producer, co-writing the second episode to go into production, "Suddenly Human". After two years, Taylor became co-executive producer with Rick Berman and Michael Piller and served as executive producer/showrunner for the (final) seventh season of The Next Generation. During this time, she received credit on a number of episodes, including Wil Wheaton's final episode as a regular character, "Final Mission"; the episode that introduced the Cardassian race, which featured heavily in Star Trek: Deep Space Nine, "The Wounded";, the first of a two part episode featuring Spock, "Unification", and the script she has said she is most proud of "The Drumhead".

During the last year of The Next Generation, Taylor worked with Rick Berman and Michael Piller to develop the fourth Star Trek series, Star Trek: Voyager. When The Next Generation production ended, Taylor transferred to the Voyager production staff and served as executive producer with Rick Berman during the first four years.  At the beginning of the third season, when Piller moved to a reduced creative consultant role, Taylor became head of the writing staff (showrunner) and stayed in that role until the end of the fourth season in 1998, when she retired and handed over control of the writing staff to Brannon Braga. Despite retiring, she continued to work with the Voyager team as creative consultant during the show's last three seasons.

During her time on The Next Generation and Voyager, Taylor wrote three Star Trek novels for Pocket Books: a novelisation of "Unification" that she wrote at the same time she was scripting its first part, and two Voyager novels that expanded on the background of the characters she had helped create for the series. In Pathways, for example, she uses a fix-up presentation to describe several characters' childhood and early adult experiences leading to joining the Voyager crew.

Between the years 1995 to 1998, Taylor gave the Indiana University Lilly Library a collection of her screenwriting work including outlines, scripts for the Next Generation series and for the first two Voyager seasons, technical notes, cast lists, and shooting schedules for the final season of The Next Generation (1993–1994), casting call sheets and research notes for Voyager (1994–1996). Some of the outlines, technical notes, and lists contain Taylor's handwritten changes and comments.

Bibliography 
 Taylor, Jeri (1991). Unification. Pocket Books. .
 Taylor, Jeri (1996). Mosaic. Pocket Books. .
 Taylor, Jeri (1998). Pathways. Pocket Books. .

References

External links
 

1938 births
Living people
Writers from Bloomington, Indiana
Indiana University alumni
California State University, Northridge alumni
Showrunners
American science fiction writers
American television executives
American television writers
Place of birth missing (living people)
20th-century American novelists
20th-century American women writers
Women science fiction and fantasy writers
American women novelists
Novelists from Indiana
Screenwriters from Indiana
Screenwriters from California
American women television producers
American women television writers
21st-century American women writers